The Taurus Model 617 is a double-action, seven-shot, snubnosed revolver chambered in .357 Magnum, with a 2" barrel.  It is offered in stainless steel and was formerly available blued. A Titanium model was available but has since been discontinued. It features an exposed hammer.  Like many Taurus revolvers, it features an integral keylock. It can be fired both in Single-action and Double-action.

See also
 Taurus Model 605
 Taurus Model 608
 Taurus Model 817

References

Taurus revolvers